Kuster is a surname; notable people with this surname include::

 Andrew Kuster (born 1969), American writer, composer, conductor; former husband of Kristin Kuster
 Ann McLane Kuster (Annie Kuster, born 1956), United States attorney and politician
 Anton Kuster (born 1923), Swiss sprint canoer
 Bill Kuster (1930–2006), American television meteorologist
 Brigitte Kuster (born 1959), French politician
 Judith Kuster, American speech-language pathologist
 Kristin Kuster (born 1973), American composer; former spouse of Andrew Kuster
 Selina Kuster (born 1991), Swiss footballer

See also
Kuster Mill, historic fulling mill in Pennsylvania
Küster